Erika Bello (born 30 November 1975) is an Italian former rower. She competed in the women's double sculls event at the 1996 Summer Olympics.

References

External links
 

1975 births
Living people
Italian female rowers
Olympic rowers of Italy
Rowers at the 1996 Summer Olympics
Rowers from Rome
World Rowing Championships medalists for Italy